Melloblocco is an international bouldering competition, which is held annually in Val Masino and Val di Mello since 2004.

History
The 2011 edition, the eighth time the competition was hosted, had 2600 participants from 22 different countries. The competition usually takes place the first weekend in May and lasts three days. The bouldering problems are plotted in the three to four months before the meeting by Simone Pedeferri. The problems are of varying difficulty, but only the most difficult, usually eight men and the same for women, are counted for the prize. On the last day, rewards are given to athletes who are able to climb as many of the boulders as possible during the competition.

Winners

References

External links
 

Climbing competitions